BPAY, (BPAY Group Holding Pty Ltd), is an Australian electronic bill payment SaaS company which facilitates payments made through a financial institution's online, mobile or telephone banking facility to organisations which are registered BPAY billers.

BPAY is the registered trading name of BPAY Pty Ltd, a wholly owned subsidiary of Cardlink Services Limited. Cardlink is a self-regulating organisation owned equally by the four major Australian banks: Australia & New Zealand Banking Group, Commonwealth Bank, National Australia Bank and Westpac.

History 
BPAY was launched, on 18 November 1997, as an electronic bill payment system for bill payments by phone. It was the world's first single bill payment service adopted across a national banking sector. In 1998, 16% of Australian households had residential internet service; ten years on, the figure had risen to 67%. BPAY is considered a driver for online banking.

In 2001, 56% of payments were authorized by phone, and 44% were executed online. By 2007, 76% of payments were performed online, while 24% were initiated by phone.

In 2002, BPAY View was introduced, which delivers bills and statements electronically to participating Australian financial institutions, which then send an SMS or email to the customer who would go onto the internet banking site to authorise payment.

As of January 2015, BPAY payments can be made through more than 156 participating Australian banks, credit unions and financial institutions. More than 45,000 businesses accept payments using BPAY and each month approximately 30 million bills to the value of $24 billion are paid using BPAY. In 2022, BPAY was offered by over 60,000 businesses.

In the Spring of 2021, Osko assigned a change in strategy at the New Payments Platform (NPPA) as the trigger for its write-down of Osko. That September, the Australian Competition & Consumer Commission (ACCC) authorised the proposed merger of Eftpos with BPAY Group Holding Pty Ltd and NPP Australia Ltd, better known as the  NPPA.

How BPAY works 
BPAY operates in a manner similar to Mastercard and Visa credit cards, by contractually obligating participating financial institutes to each other.

Billers
Businesses and other organisations in Australia participate in BPAY as billers after registering with BPAY Pty Ltd. through their individual banking institution. A biller must also have an  Australian Company Number (ACN) or Australian Business Number (ABN), and a bank account at an Australian financial institution. Billers designate the bank account to which amounts received are to be deposited, as well as the account to which fees are to be charged.

BPAY allocates a BPAY biller number to each client business. The biller includes the BPAY logo and biller number on their bills, as well as the reference number that a customer would use when making a payment.

The biller usually pays a fee to its bank, and the credit card company, when a card is used by customers in payment.

Making payments
To make payments using BPAY, the payee must be a customer of a participating Australian financial institution and be registered for any of its online, mobile or telephone banking services. The customer does not need to register for the BPAY service itself to make a payment using BPAY. They are usually not required to pay a fee for using the BPAY service.

To make a payment, a customer visits their Australian financial institution's online, mobile or telephone banking facility, where they would enter the BPAY biller number, reference number and payment amount as well as an indication of the account to be debited, which may also be a credit card. Some billers may not accept credit cards (or accept payment from a limited list of credit cards) in payment through BPAY. The financial institution may also limit the accounts which may be used for BPAY payments, and save the biller references information for use by the customer for future payments.

Settlement 
After a customer confirms a BPAY payment, the financial institution where the payment was made sends by electronic funds transfer the payment details to the biller's bank (if different). The biller's bank then credits the biller's designated bank account with the payment amount, and will advise the biller the customer reference number and payment amount, for automatic or manual entry into its accounting system. Transactions completed before a cut-off time set by the financial institution will normally be processed and paid on the same day, otherwise it will be processed on the next business day. The remitting (customer's) bank may charge the biller's bank an interchange fee and the biller's bank will charge the biller its fee, usually on a monthly basis.

BPAY View
BPAY View was introduced in 2002. To be part of the system, a BPAY biller would also need to register for the BPAY View service. The biller would then include the BPAY View logo on its bills. The customer, on receiving the bill, may then go onto their financial institution's internet banking site or app to register the bill. Once registered, the bills are delivered electronically by the biller to participating Australian financial institution, which then sends an SMS or email to the customer, who would go onto the financial institution's internet banking site to view the bill and authorise payment.

Many billers opt for its customers to arrange direct debits of the bill instead of setting up BPAY View. This enables payments being made on the due date without the need for a customer to do anything else, other than to ensure that there are or will be sufficient funds on the due date in the account to be debited. The biller would typically send the customer a SMS or email advising that a debit will be made on a particular date and the amount, with either the bill being attached or with a link to the bill being provided.

Osko by BPAY
Osko by BPAY was launched in September 2018, under the New Payments Platform, and allows payments to be sent and received between participating financial institutions in less than a minute every day, throughout the day. In addition to use of the traditional BSB and account number, payments can also be made using another person's PayID, which can be a registered mobile number, email address or ABN, that is linked to the recipient's bank account. To transfer funds to the account the transferor can use the PayID instead of the BSB and account number.

References

External links 
 BPAY website

Payment service providers
Payment systems
Banking in Australia
Online payments
Computer-related introductions in 1997
E-commerce in Australia
Electronic funds transfer
Financial services companies of Australia
Online financial services companies of Australia
Merchant services
Financial technology companies
1997 establishments in Australia